The siege of Anapa may refer to:
Siege of Anapa (1791), a battle in the Russo-Turkish War (1787–1792) and the Russo-Circassian War
Siege of Anapa (1820s), an event in the Russo-Turkish War (1828–29) and the Russo-Circassian War